Tonga is a village on Nanumanga island in Tuvalu.

Demographics
Tonga's population is 236, making it the second most populous village on Nanumanga.
It is the main village of the island of Nanumanga. The only other village on the island is Tokelau, which has a larger population of 351.

See also 
Geography of Tuvalu

References

Populated places in Tuvalu
Nanumanga